Tahiryuaq, formerly Tahiryuak Lake, is a lake located in the Canadian Arctic's Northwest Territories. It is situated in northcentral Victoria Island, north of Prince Albert Sound, southeast of Minto Inlet.

The lake is populated with Arctic char It is designated as a Key Habitat Site because of the high density of nesting king eiders.  In addition, notable populations of Arctic tern, cackling goose, long-tailed duck, Pacific loon, pomarine jaeger, and Sabine's gulls  frequent the area.

Tahiryuak was a caribou hunting region of the Haneragmiut and the Kanianermiut Copper Inuit.

See also
 List of lakes of the Northwest Territories

References

Victoria Island (Canada)
Tahiryuak
Ornithology